Volkswagen Group China (VGC; 大众汽车(中国)) is a division of the German automotive concern Volkswagen Group in the People's Republic of China.

Volkswagen Group China enjoys sales of about 3.14 million cars (2017) in the Chinese market and is the largest brand in China by sales.  The Chinese market is Volkswagen's largest market, accounting for around 50% of Volkswagen's global sales in 2021.  Operations of Volkswagen in China include the production, sales and services of whole cars, parts and components, engines and transmission systems, and the sales and service of imported cars.  The company's locally manufactured and imported vehicles are sold under various brand names such as Volkswagen, Audi, Škoda, Bentley, and Lamborghini in China.

Volkswagen Group China is the largest, earliest, and the most successful international partner in China's automotive industry. It started its connection with China as early as in 1978, and has been taking the leading position in the Chinese automotive market for more than 25 years.  Its first joint venture in China, Shanghai Volkswagen Automotive Co., Ltd., was established in October 1984. This joint venture, now called SAIC Volkswagen. was in the process of building an electric-car plant in Anting, near Shanghai by late 2018; it was expected to make 300,000 e-vehicles per year, starting in 2020.

The second joint venture, FAW-Volkswagen Automotive Company Ltd. was established in Changchun in February 1991. It manufactures VW and Audi brand cars. In 2018, an executive with FAW-Volkswagen's Audi division said that two million China-made Audi cars will be sold in the country by 2020. As of the end of 2017, the total to date was 777,000.

History
In 1984, Volkswagen signed a 25-year contract to make passenger cars in Shanghai. Since, at that time, vehicle manufacturers could not own a majority stake in a manufacturing plant, Volkswagen's venture took the limit of 50 per cent foreign ownership.

Today, the Group has 16 representative companies in the country, undertaking parts delivery and service provision for both customers and industry in addition to vehicle production and import.

By May 2004, Volkswagen Group had concentrated its strengths in the founding of Volkswagen Group China (VGC), which is governed by a six-member management team responsible for the areas of sales and marketing, technology, purchasing, personnel and governmental relations as well as finance.  VGC's tasks include supervision of the Chinese associated companies of the Volkswagen Group, and the set-up of new business segments.

Operations
Volkswagen Group, via its Volkswagen Group China division, has 16 subsidiaries in China, with Shanghai Automotive Industry Corporation (SAIC), and First Automobile Works (FAW) being the two major Chinese partner companies.

SAIC-Volkswagen

In 1984, a joint venture (JV) was established between Volkswagen Group and Shanghai Automotive Industry Corporation (now SAIC Motor), creating Shanghai Volkswagen Automotive Co., Ltd. (SVW), headquartered in Anting, Shanghai. Equity holdings are split (as of 2010) - Volkswagen AG (40%),  Volkswagen (China) Invest (10%), SAIC (50%).  This a fixed term venture, of 45 years, running until 2030.

Shanghai Volkswagen Automotive Co., Ltd. (SVW) is the first car-making joint venture since China began its reform, and debut to the outside world, and is located in Anting International Auto City on the northwest outskirts of Shanghai.  Producing cars under the Volkswagen and the Škoda brands, SVW currently offers a total of twelve model series. By October 2009, SVW had turned out over five million cars in total, becoming the carmaker that has the biggest population of cars in China.

SAIC-Volkswagen and Škoda
In April 2005, Škoda officially landed at Shanghai Volkswagen, ushering Shanghai Volkswagen into the dual brand era.  In September 2006, Shanghai Volkswagen Škoda – the first Chinese manufactured Škoda - was launched and the Chinese name was announced.

Octavia, the first Shanghai Volkswagen Škoda model, hit the market on 6 June 2007. Following Octavia's success, Shanghai Volkswagen launched Fabia in 2008 and Superb in 2009.

SAIC-Volkswagen and Audi
In 2021, SAIC-Volkswagen launched the production of Audi branded cars, with the first being the Audi A7L. It has plans to sell 250,000 to 300,000 units per year by 2025 after the launch of other models. According to SAIC Audi marketing division, Audi cars that SAIC-Volkswagen intend to launch are all superior to the existing Audi models of FAW-Volkswagen.

FAW-Volkswagen

Established in February 1991, FAW-Volkswagen Automotive Company (FAW-VW) is a joint venture by FAW Group's First Automobile Works, Volkswagen AG, Audi AG and Volkswagen (China) Investment Co., Ltd headquartered in Changchun, Jilin.  It was the first modern car industrial base constructed with an economy of scale in China.  With its development over the years, FAW-Volkswagen is producing thousands of vehicles on a daily basis.

FAW-Volkswagen manufactures 10 products of two globally known brands, Volkswagen Passenger Cars and Audi, with advanced technology and equipment.  Volkswagen Jetta, New Bora, Golf, Sagitar, Magotan, Volkswagen CC, Audi A6L, Audi A4L, Audi Q3 and Audi Q5 cars are very popular among consumers.  FAW-Volkswagen is a mature production base in China, with a complete portfolio of both A-, B- and C-grade cars.

FAW-Volkswagen and Audi
Audi AG, with more than 20 years of development experience in China, was the first global premium car brand to realize domestic production in China.

Agreements on the manufacturing of the Audi 100 under license were signed on 13 August 1988, with this date marking the conclusion of negotiations lasting one year.  The joint venture agreement included both the technology transfer for the production and planning of the Audi 100, and the setting up of after sales support.  Expertise was in addition transferred by providing training for some 500 Chinese workers at Audi in Germany.  Furthermore, around 30 Audi employees were posted to Changchun to provide production support.
 
In November 1993, the then-Board Chairman of FAW and Volkswagen AG, signed a letter of intent on the integration of Audi production and a V6 engine plant into the FAW-Volkswagen joint venture, which had been established at the end of 1991.  As a result of the signing of the agreements in December 1995, Audi acquired a 10 percent stake in the joint venture by the name of FAW-Volkswagen Automotive Company Ltd.  Volkswagen AG controls 30 percent, with FAW continuing to hold a 60 percent stake.

The first Audi product built by the joint venture, a modified Audi 100 with V6 engine bearing the model designation Audi 200, went into production in May 1996.  The Audi 200 remained in production until summer 1999 (facelift of the Audi 100) with 2.6 and 2.4 litre V6 engines and the 4-cylinder, 1.8 litre turbo power unit.  The content manufactured locally at the Changchun plant was 60 percent.

Volkswagen Anhui
Volkswagen Anhui (formerly JAC-Volkswagen) is a joint venture formed in 2017 between JAC Motors and Volkswagen headquartered in Hefei, Anhui, initially to produce electric vehicles under the SEAT brand, and later the Sehol brand. 

It was renamed to Volkswagen Anhui after Volkswagen took a majority stake (75%) in the company in 2020 along with a 50% stake in government-owned JAG (parent of JAC) in a one billion euro deal. The company will focus on electric vehicles, with an eMobility R&D hub that will serve the entire Volkswagen Group in China.

Volkswagen is building a new factory for Volkswagen MEB platform electric vehicles with a capacity of 350,000 a year under the company, alongside a battery systems factory under wholly-owned VW Anhui Components Company.

Further VGC entities
The following are the subsidiary companies which form Volkswagen Group China:

See also

List of Volkswagen Group factories

References

External links
Volkswagen Group China (VGC)
Volkswagen Anhui Corporate 
SAIC Volkswagen Corporate 
FAW-Volkswagen Corporate 
Volkswagen Brand China (all products) 
Volkswagen (SAIC VW) 
Volkswagen (FAW-VW) 
Audi Brand China (includes imported and FAW products) 
SAIC Audi China 
Skoda Brand China 
Jetta Brand China 
Volkswagen Finance (China) Co., Ltd. 

Shanghai Automotive Industry Company (SAIC)
SAIC Motor Group 

First Automobile Works (FAW)
FAW Group corporate website 
FAW website with FAW-VW history 
FAW website with FAW-VW landmarks 

Independent links
Global Auto Index's engine specification & model list

Car manufacturers of China
Volkswagen Group
Chinese subsidiaries of foreign companies
Chinese-foreign joint-venture companies